Mian Darreh (also Romanized as Mīān Darreh) is a village in Qanibeyglu Rural District, Zanjanrud District, Zanjan County, Zanjan Province, Iran. At the 2006 census, its population was 116, in 24 families.

References 

Populated places in Zanjan County